Cyberpsychology (also known as Internet psychology, media psychology, web psychology, or digital psychology) is a scientific inter-disciplinary domain that focuses on the psychological phenomena which emerge as a result of the human interaction with digital technology, particularly the Internet.

Overview
Cyberpsychology is the study of the human mind and behavior and how the culture of technology, specifically, virtual reality, the internet, and social media, affect them. Mainstream research studies focus on the effect of the Internet and cyberspace on the psychology of individuals and groups. Some hot topics include: online identity, online relationships, personality types in cyberspace, transference to computers, addiction to computers and Internet, regressive behavior in cyberspace, online gender-switching, etc. While much research in this field is based around Internet usage, cyberpsychology also includes the study of the psychological ramifications of cyborgs, artificial intelligence, and virtual reality. Cybersecurity is within cyberpsychology because it impacts the way that people live on a daily basis.

Professional Bodies 
The British Psychological Society has a dedicated Cyberpsychology Section which was founded in 2018. Likewise the American Psychological Association has a dedicated division for Media Psychology & Technology.

Social media and cyberpsychological behavior

It was around the turn of the millennium that the United States broke the 50 percent mark in Internet use, personal computer use, and cell phone use. The relevance of human–computer interaction (HCI) research within the field of cyberpsychology may become more visible and necessary in understanding the current modern lifestyles of many people.

Facebook, the leading online social media platform globally, affects users' psychological status in multiple ways. Facebook follows the one-to-many communication pattern, allowing users to share information about their lives, including social activities and photographs. This feature was enhanced in 2012, when Facebook Messenger was implemented to allow users more one-on-one communication merging with the Facebook Chat feature. Facebook users enjoy the sense of being connected.

Comparison and low self-esteem
Social media can be deceptive when the user sees only the joyous or entertaining experiences in a friend's life and compares them to their own lesser experiences.  Underestimating peers negative experiences correlates with greater loneliness and lower overall life satisfaction. Inviting constant comparisons inevitably lowers self-esteem and feelings of self-worth; hence, Facebook and other social media accounts appear to exploit a vulnerability in human nature.

Depression
Decreased self-esteem can increase depression. Facebook specifically is criticized for causing depression, especially among teenage users. A study concluded that frequent Facebook use invoked feelings of depression and inadequacy. Social psychologist Ethan Kross, the lead author of the study, stated that the research tracked (on a moment-to-moment basis throughout the day) how a person's mood fluctuated during time spent on Facebook and whether or not they modified their Facebook usage. Results suggest that as participants spent more time on Facebook, their feelings of well-being decreased and feelings of depression increased. Another study found that participants in the highest quartile for social media site visits per week were at an increased likelihood of experiencing depression.

Social isolation and ostracism 
Excessive social media usage increases feelings of social isolation, as virtual relationships replace authentic social interactions. 
Additionally, one study found that social rejection or ostracism in an immersive virtual environment has a negative impact on affect (emotion), in the same way, that ostracism negatively impacts emotions in real life contexts.

The size of an individual's online social network is closely linked to brain structure associated with social cognition. Because of the access people have had to internet technologies, some behaviors can be characterized as information foraging. Information foraging is the theory of how people navigate the web to satisfy an informational need. It essentially says that, when users have a certain information goal, they assess the information that they can extract from any candidate source of information relative to the cost involved in extracting that information and choose one or several candidate sources so that they maximize the ratio.  From a social standpoint, the internet is a breeding ground for creating a space for relationships, roles, and a new sense of self.

Negative relationships
One survey found that a high level of Facebook usage is associated with adverse relationship outcomes (such as divorce and breaking up) and that these negative outcomes are mediated by conflict about high levels of Facebook use. However, this was only true for those who are or have been, in relatively newer relationships of three years or less.

To cope with the uncertainty of a suspected romantic relationship, partner surveillance on Facebook is becoming more popular. However, skepticism between couples may inevitably cause the end of a relationship.

It is important to note that these findings do not demonstrate causality: relationship maintenance behaviors, such as surveillance and monitoring, are indicators of current levels of trust within the relationship. This suggests that certain behaviors on social media may be predicting negative outcomes, rather than causing them. When it comes to technology lot of people do not know when something has gone wrong until it goes wrong. Further, Facebook can be a tool in strengthening and reaffirming a relationship, as it allows for positive expressions of trust, affection, and commitment.

Fear of missing out (FOMO)

A byproduct of social media use can be the "fear of missing out", or FOMO. This fear develops from a user's repetitive and obsessive status-checking of "friend" status updates and posts related to social events or celebrations resulting in a feeling of being "left out" if these events are not experienced.  There is also the closely related fear of being missed (FOBM), or the fear of invisibility. This fear involves an obsessive need to provide constant status updates on one's own personal, day-to-day life, movements, travel, events, etc. unable to "un-plug". Evidence suggests this type of anxiety is a mediating factor in increased social media use and decreased self-esteem.

Sleep deprivation
Social media at use can lead to lower quality sleep.

A study commissioned by Travelodge hotels concluded that Britain has become a nation of 'Online-A-Holics'. On average, Britons spend 16 minutes in bed socially networking with pals each night – the peak chatting time being 9:45 pm. This time spent social networking may be affecting Britons' sleep quota as, on average, respondents reported they are getting just six hours and 21 minutes of sleep per night. 65% of respondents stated the last thing they do before nodding off at night is check their mobile phone for text messages. On average, Britons will spend around nine minutes every night texting before falling asleep, and four out of ten adults reported they have a regular text communication with friends in bed every night.

Addictive behavior

Studies have shown a connection between online social media, such as Facebook use, to addictive behaviors, emotion regulation, impulse control, and substance abuse. This may be because people are learning to access and process information more rapidly and to shift attention quickly from one task to the next. All this access and vast selection is causing some entertainment seekers to develop the constant need for instant gratification with a loss of patience. Results from a survey of university undergraduates showed that almost 10% met criteria for what investigators describe as "disordered social networking use". Respondents who met criteria for "Facebook addiction" also reported statistically significant symptoms similar to the symptoms of addiction, such as tolerance (increased Facebook use over time), withdrawal (irritability when unable to access Facebook), and cravings to access the site. "Our findings suggest that there may be shared mechanisms underlying both substance and behavioral addictions," Hormes added.

The prevalence of internet addiction varies considerably between countries and is inversely related to the quality of life. Many countries in Asia (particularly China, South Korea, and Japan) have raised public concern over the recent rise in internet addictions.

Eating disorders
Some studies have found a correlation between social media use and disordered eating.

In women college students, social media use predicts disordered-eating symptomatology and other related variables (such as the drive for thinness and body dissatisfaction). For men, media use predicted endorsement of personal thinness and dieting.

Social media and ADHD 
An emerging body of research suggests that internet addiction and unhealthy social media activity may be more prevalent in ADHD individuals. Male college students are more likely than women college students to be screened positively for adult ADHD; however, the overall association between Internet addiction and attention deficit is more significant in females.

Clinical psychologist Michelle Frank stated, "The ADHD brain is already one that struggles with motivation, activation, organizing behaviors, managing time, and maintaining focus...Technology, left un-managed, makes these struggles considerably more difficult. The unique challenges that result are prime vulnerabilities to the common pitfalls of technology use."

Although many factors contribute to ADHD (including genes, teratogens, parenting styles, etc.), a sedentary lifestyle centered on television, computer games, and mobile devices may increase the risk for ADHD. In the view of Dr. Robert Melillo, founder of the Brain Balance Program, "When kids play computer games, their minds are processing information in a much different way than kids who are, say, running around on a playground... Recent studies have shown that playing computer games only builds very short-term attention that needs to be rewarded frequently."

Positive correlates of social media use
Several positive psychological outcomes are related to Facebook use.
People can derive a sense of social connectedness and belongingness in the online environment. Importantly, this online social connectedness was associated with lower levels of depression and anxiety, and greater levels of subjective well-being.

Messaging can also be used to express trust, affection, and commitment, thus strengthening personal relationships.

Social media and memes
Internet users sometimes relate to one another through seemingly ridiculous images and text: specifically, internet memes. Creating and using internet memes can help people to interact successfully with other people online and to build a shared experience. While internet memes can appear to be simple pop culture references, they can also allow a glimpse into the formation of culture and language.

Psychotherapy in cyberspace 
Psychotherapy in cyberspace is also known as cybertherapy or e-therapy. The first instance of this practice did not include interaction with a human, but rather a program called ELIZA, which was designed by Joseph Weizenbaum to answer questions and concerns with basic Rogerian responses.  ELIZA proved to be so convincing that many people either mistook the program for human, or became emotionally attached to it.

In online counseling, a person e-mails or chats online with a therapist. There are also new applications of technology within psychology and healthcare which utilize augmented and virtual reality components—for example in pain management treatment, PTSD treatment, use of avatars in virtual environments, and self- and clinician-guided computerized cognitive behavior therapies. The voluminous work of Azy Barak (University of Haifa) and a growing number of researchers in the US and UK gives strong evidence to the efficacy (and sometimes superiority) of Internet-facilitated, computer-assisted treatments relative to 'traditional' in-office-only approaches. The UK's National Health Service now recognizes CCBT (computerized cognitive behavioral therapy) as the preferred method of treatment for mild-to-moderate presentations of anxiety and depression. Applications in psychology and medicine also include such innovations as the "Virtual Patient" and other virtual/augmented reality programs which can provide trainees with simulated intake sessions while also providing a means for supplementing clinical supervision.

Many controversies related to e-therapy have arisen in the context of ethical guidelines and considerations.

In popular culture
Lisa Kudrow's Web-based situation comedy Web Therapy, in which Kudrow's unaccredited and unscrupulous character Fiona Wallice conducts therapy sessions using iChat, explores many of the ethical and practical issues raised by the prospect of psychotherapy conducted via Internet video chat.
Patricia Arquette recurs as FBI Special Agent in Charge Avery Ryan, a cyberpsychologist, in CSI: Crime Scene Investigation. She also headlines the spinoff series CSI: Cyber in the same role.
Forensic anthropologist Dr. Temperance Brennan and Special Agent Seeley Booth in Fox Network's hit television series, Bones, practice cyberpsychology by collecting information from suspects' social media accounts to analyze personality, communications, and possible motives to help apprehend the criminal.

See also
 Computational psychology
 Online disinhibition effect
 Psychological effects of Internet use
 Psychology of programming
 Social media therapy
 Web mining

References

Bibliography
 The Psychology of Cyberspace  by John Suler - July 2005
 Gordo-López, J. & Parker, I. (1999). Cyberpsychology. New York: Routledge. 
 Wallace, P. M. (1998). The Psychology of the Internet. Cambridge: Cambridge University Press. 
 Whittle, D. B. (1997). Cyberspace: The human dimension. New York: W.H. Freeman.

Journals
 Journal of Computer Mediated Communication
 Cyberpsychology: Journal of Psychosocial Research on Cyberspace
 Cyberpsychology, Behavior, and Social Networking
 Journal of CyberTherapy & Rehabilitation

Books
 The Cyber Effect: A Pioneering Cyberpsychologist Explains How Human Behavior Changes Online by Mary Aiken, PhD (2016) Spiegel & Grau. 
 
 Cyberpsychology: An Introduction to Human-Computer Interaction by Kent Norman (2008) Cambridge University of Press. 
 The Psychology of Menu Selection: Designing Cognitive Control at the Human/Computer Interface by Kent Norman
 Virtual Reality Therapy for Anxiety Disorders: Advances in Evaluation and Treatment by Brenda K. Wiederhold and Mark D. Wiederhold (2005) American Psychological Association.  
 Psychological aspects of cyberspace: Theory, research, applications. by Azy Barak (2008) Cambridge University Press. 

 
Psychological theories